Deulgaon Bazar is a village in Sillod taluka in the Indian state of Aurangabad district, Maharashtra.

The village is situated on the bank of the Charna river, 27 km from Sillod. Due to the presence of various temples in the village, it was named Deulgaon (village of temples). The population is approximately 7000.

Deulgaon Bazar is native place of Adv Gajanan Shenphadu Sirsath, Industrialist Mr. Shivaji V. Deshmukh , Anil Deshmukh.
Deulgaon Bazar was famous for yielding Chili.

Villages in Aurangabad district, Maharashtra